The 1937 Copa Ibarguren was the 14th. edition of this National cup of Argentina. It was played by the champions of both leagues, Primera División and Asociación Rosarina de Fútbol crowned during 1937, after a hiatus of 12 years.

River Plate (Primera División champion) faced Rosario Central (Liga Rosarina champion) at San Lorenzo de Almagro's venue, Estadio Gasómetro, in the Boedo neighborhood of Buenos Aires, on January 8, 1938. With three goals by striker Bernabé Ferreyra, River thrashed Central 5–0 and won its first Copa Ibarguren trophy.

Qualified teams

Match details

References

Club Atlético River Plate matches
Rosario Central matches
1937 in Argentine football
1937 in South American football